There have been six Baronetcies created for persons with the surname Brown (as distinct from Browne and Broun), one in the Baronetage of Nova Scotia, one in the Baronetage of England, two in the Baronetage of Great Britain and two in the Baronetage of the United Kingdom. Two creations are extant as of 2010.

Brown baronets, of Barbados (1664)
Sir James Brown, 1st Baronet (died )

The Brown Baronetcy, of Barbados in the West Indies, was created in the Baronetage of Nova Scotia on 21 September 1664 for James Brown. The title became extinct on his death in circa 1670.

Brown baronets, of London (1699)
Sir William Brown, 1st Baronet (died c. 1720)
Sir John Brown, 2nd Baronet (died c. 1738)
Sir _ Brown, 3rd Baronet (died c. 1760)

The Brown Baronetcy, of London, was created in the Baronetage of England on 14 December 1699 for William Brown. The third Baronet's first name is not known. The title is presumed to have become extinct on his death in circa 1760.

Brown baronets, of Edinburgh (1710)
Sir Robert Brown, 1st Baronet

The Brown Baronetcy, of Edinburgh in the County of Midlothian, was created in the Baronetage of Great Britain on 24 February 1710 for "Robert Brown, Lord Provost of Edinburgh". At this time, however, there was no Provost of Edinburgh called Robert Brown. Adam Brown was Lord Provost of Edinburgh in 1710 and until his death on 16 October 1711, but he did not have a knighthood. Whoever was granted the baronetcy, the title is presumed to have become extinct on his death.

Brown baronets, of Westminster (1731)
Sir Robert Brown, 1st Baronet (died 1760)
Sir James O'Hara Brown, 2nd Baronet (c. 1721–1784)
Sir William Augustus Brown, 3rd Baronet (1764–1830)

The Brown Baronetcy, of the City and Liberty of Westminster, was created in the Baronetage of Great Britain on 11 March 1731 for Robert Brown, an Irish merchant and Member of Parliament for Ilchester, with a special remainder to his two brothers. Brown died in 1760 and the baronetcy devolved according to the special remainder to his nephew. On the death of the third Baronet, the latter's son, the title became extinct in 1830.

Brown baronets, of Richmond Hill (1863)
 Sir William Brown, 1st Baronet (1784–1864)
 Alexander Brown (1817–1849), only son of the 1st Baronet.
 James Clifton Brown (1841–1917)
 Sir Alexander Brown, 1st Baronet (1844–1922)
 Sir William Richmond Brown, 2nd Baronet (1840–1906), eldest son of Alexander Brown and grandson of the 1st Baronet.
 Frederick Richmond Brown (1868–1933)
 Sir Melville Richmond Brown, 3rd Baronet (1866–1944)
 Sir Charles Frederick Richmond Brown, 4th Baronet (1902–1995), son Frederick Richmond Brown and grandson of 2nd Baronet.
 Sir George Francis Richmond Brown, 5th Baronet (born 1938)

The Brown Baronetcy, of Richmond Hill in the County Palatine of Lancaster, was created in the Baronetage of the United Kingdom on 24 January 1863 for the merchant and banker William Brown, of Astrop House, Kings Sutton, Northamptonshire. The baronetcy was conferred in honour of his services to the city of Liverpool. The second Baronet was High Sheriff of Northamptonshire in 1873. The fourth Baronet was a deputy lieutenant of the North Riding of Yorkshire. James Clifton Brown, second son of Alexander Brown, eldest son of the first Baronet, was Member of Parliament for Horsham. He was the father of (1) Howard Clifton Brown, a Brigadier-General in the British Army and Member of Parliament for Newbury, and of (2) Douglas Clifton Brown, 1st Viscount Ruffside, Speaker of the House of Commons.

The heir apparent to the baronetcy is Sam George Richmond Brown (born 1979), eldest son of the 5th Baronet.

Brown, later Pigott-Brown baronets, of Broome Hall (1903)
see Pigott-Brown baronets

The Brown, later Pigott-Brown Baronetcy, of Broome Hall in Capel in the County of Surrey, was created in the Baronetage of the United Kingdom on 5 January 1903 for Alexander Brown, third son of Alexander Brown, eldest son of the first Baronet of Richmond Hill. For more information on this creation, see Pigott-Brown baronets.

See also
Browne baronets
Broun baronets
Viscount Ruffside

References

Kidd, Charles, Williamson, David (editors). Debrett's Peerage and Baronetage (1990 edition). New York: St Martin's Press, 1990.

Baronetcies in the Baronetage of the United Kingdom
Extinct baronetcies in the Baronetage of Nova Scotia
Extinct baronetcies in the Baronetage of England
Extinct baronetcies in the Baronetage of Great Britain
Baronetcies created with special remainders
1664 establishments in the British Empire